Muhammad Yaqub Bek (محمد یعقوب بیگ; , Ya’qub-bek; ; 182030 May 1877) was a Khoqandi ruler of Yettishar (Kashgaria) during his invasion of Xinjiang from 1865 to 1877. He held the title of Atalik Ghazi ("Champion Father").

Spelling variants
In English-language literature, the name Yaqub Beg has also been spelt as Yakub Beg (Encyclopædia Britannica), Yakoob Beg (Boulger, 1878) or Ya`qūb Beg (Kim Hodong, 2004). Authors using Russian sources have also used the spelling Yakub-bek (Paine, 1996). A few publications in English written by Chinese authors spell his name Agubo, which is the Pinyin transcription of the Chinese transcription of his name, 阿古柏.

The first name, Muhammad, is subject to the usual variations in spelling as well. Ya`qūb is an Arabic analogue of Jacob, and Beg is a Turkic noble title.

Background
Beg's ethnic background is uncertain. According to his biographer, D. Boulger, Beg was a Tajik and a descendant of Timur, but the claim is self-contradictory: as a Tajik, Beg would have had to have a link on his mother's side in order to be considered Timur's offspring, but Timur was actually a Turco-Mongol from the Barlas tribe. Hodong Kim suggests the claim is an unsupported fabrication intended to glorify Beg's genealogy by ascribing his descent to both Timur and Genghis Khan.

According to H. Bellew, a member of the British embassy, Beg's physiognomy reflected a mixture of Mongol and Turkic features rather than Tajik ones: 

Beg's forefathers had lived in the mountainous part of Karategin before moving to Dehbid, near Samarkand. Beg's father, Pur Muhhammad, was born in Samarkand and completed his education in Khojent, later working as a qadi (a judge) at Piskent. He married a local qadi as his second wife. She bore his son Ya'qüb Beg in 1820.

Life

Early life
Yakub Beg was born in the town of Pskente, in the Khanate of Kokand (now in Uzbekistan).

Career
Beg's lax lifestyle worried his uncle who sent him to Tashkent to become a weaver. However, Beg quickly became bored and returned to Piskent where he obtained a minor job under the general Ghadai Bai.

He later worked under the governor of Khojent, Muhhammad Karim Khaska. When Aziz Bacha was appointed as the governor of Tashkent, Muhhammad Karim Khaska was transferred to the Khanate of Kokand along with Beg, but Kashka was soon assassinated by Musulman Quli. This juncture caused Beg to seek service in cavalry under Bacha. Kilauchi's governor Nar Muhhammad married Beg's sister around this time. In 1847, Nar Muhhammad succeeded Kashka as governor of Tashkent, and Beg was appointed as Beg of Chinaz. Around 1849, he was transferred and appointed as commander of Ak-Mechet, primarily owing to his brother-in-law's influence.Beg soon amassed a large fortune. He was involved in the complex factional shifts of the Khanate of Kokand. The internal rivalry between Musalman Quli who was the Mingbashi at the time and Nar Muhhammad led to a clash in 1852 where Quli fled, and one of Nar's allies Utambai became Mingbashi. Beg was subsequently recalled back to Tashkent where he was promoted to the rank of military officer with the title of Baturbashi.

Qipchaq massacre
In late 1852, Muhammad Khudayar Khan, taking advantage of the disunity between the nomadic Qipchaqs and wishing to end their interference in the politics of the Khanate, attempted a coup. The rival Qipchaqs, Nar Muhhammad and Quli were both captured and executed. According to Vladimir Nalivkin, Beg conspired against the Nar and allied himself with Khudayar, however the veracity of this claim is doubtful. Many Qipchaqs were massacred, and this led to an end of the domination of the Qipchaqs over Khokand. There is some uncertainty as to the whereabouts of Beg between 1852 and 1864. In 1864, however, he helped defend Tashkent during the first Russian attack.

Invasion of Xinjiang

Initial attacks (1865)
As a result of the Dungan Revolt (1862–77), by 1864, the Chinese held only the citadels of Kashgar and a few other places. The Kyrgyz, or Kazakh Sadic Beg, entered Kashgar but were unable to take the citadel and were sent to Tashkent as a Khoja to become ruler. Burzug Khan, the only surviving son of Jahangir Khoja, left Tashkent with six men. He joined by Yakub Beg, left Kokand with 68 men, and crossed the border of China in January 1865. Sadic Beg, defeated by Yakub Beg, was driven beyond the mountains. Yakub went southeast to Yarkand, the largest town in the region, and was driven out by an army from Kucha. He next besieged the Chinese at Yangi Hissar for 40 days and massacred the garrison. Sadic Beg reappeared, was defeated, and talked into becoming an ally. Invaders from Badakshan were also talked into an alliance. A Dungan force from Kucha and eastward arrived at Maralbeshi and was defeated with 1,000 of the Dungans joining Yakub Beg. Yarkand had decided to submit to Burzug Khan and his great vizier. In September 1865, the second in command and 3,000 men surrendered, converted to Islam, and joined Yakub Beg. The commander refused and blew himself up along with his family; the commanders of Yarkand and Kulja had done the same. An army of rebels from Kokand arrived and joined Yakub. Later in the year, Burzug Khan and Yakub went to Yarkand to deal with a disturbance. The Dungan faction suborned Yakub's Dungans and he was reduced to a few hundred men. Burzug drew off to a separate camp, Yakub defeated the Dungans, Burzug Khan fled to Kashgar and declared Yakub a traitor. The religious leaders supported Yakub, and Burzug was seized in his palace. He was confined for 18 months, exiled to Tibet, and later found his way to Kokand. In little more than a year, Yakub had become master of Kashgar, Yarkand, and Maralbashi, areas stretching roughly from the western end of the Tarim Basin to as far as the Yarkand River.

The Tarim Basin was conquered by Beg acting as a Khoqandi foreigner and not as a local.

Later reign
The Khan of Kokand had some claim over Barzug Khan as a subject, but did nothing in practice. Yaqub entered into relations and signed treaties with the Russian Empire and Great Britain, but failed in trying to get their support for his invasion.

Yaqub Beg was given the title of "Athalik Ghazi, Champion Father of the Faithful" by the Amir of Bokhara in 1866. The Ottoman Sultan also granted him the title of Amir.

Popularity
Yaqub Beg's rule was unpopular among the natives, with one of the local Kashgaris, a warrior and a chieftain's son, commenting: "During the Chinese rule there was everything; there is nothing now." Trade also declined. Yakub was disliked by his Turkic Muslim subjects, burdening them with heavy taxes and subjecting them to a harsh interpretation of Islamic Sharia law.

Korean historian Kim Hodong points out the fact that his disastrous and inexact commands failed the locals and they, in turn, welcomed the return of Chinese troops. Qing dynasty general Zuo Zongtang wrote that "The Andijanis are tyrannical to their people; government troops should comfort them with benevolence. The Andijanis are greedy in extorting from the people; government troops should rectify this by being generous."

Death

His precise manner of death is unclear. The Times of London and the Russian Turkestan Gazette both reported that he had died after a short illness. Historian Musa Sayrami stated that he was poisoned on May 30, 1877, in Korla by the former hakim (local city ruler) of Yarkand, Niyaz Hakim Beg, as part of a conspiracy with Qing Dynasty forces in Jungaria. However, in a letter to the Qing authorities, Niyaz denied any involvement in the death of Yakub, claiming that the Kashgarian ruler had committed suicide. Other sources also state that he was killed in battle with the Chinese.

While contemporaneous Muslim writers usually explained Yakub Beg's death by poisoning, and the suicide theory was the accepted truth among the Qing generals of the time, modern historians, according to Kim Hodong, think that natural death (of a stroke) is the most plausible explanation.

The exact date of Yakub's death is uncertain. Although Sayrami claimed that he died on April 28, 1877, modern historians think that this is impossible, as Przewalski met him on May 9. Chinese sources usually give May 22 as the date of his death, while Aleksey Kuropatkin thought it to be May 29. Late May, 1877 is therefore thought to be the most likely time period. Official sources from the US State Department and activists involved in the incident state that Yaqub's sons and grandson had their sentences commuted to life imprisonment with a fund provided for their support.

Legacy

Rebiya Kadeer praised Yakub Beg.

Tributes
A son of general and politician Yulbars Khan was named after Yaqub Beg.

In media
Yaqub makes an appearance in the second half of George Macdonald Fraser's novel Flashman at the Charge.

Al Qaeda
Al-Qaeda ideologue Mustafa Setmariam Nasar praised Yaqub and his establishment of educational institutions for Islam, and mosques called him "Attalik Ghazi" and a "good man" for his war against Buddhists and the Chinese.

The Doğu Türkistan Haber Ajansı (East Turkestan News Agency) published an article from Al-Qaeda branch Al-Nusra Front's English language Al-Risalah magazine (مجلة الرسالة), second issue (العدد الثاني), translated from English into Turkish and titled Al Risale: "Türkistan Dağları" 2. Bölüm (The Message: "Turkistan Mountains" Part 2), which praised the Sharia implemented by Yaqub and cited him as an upholder of Jihad, attacking the Qing.

See also
 Xinjiang under Qing rule
 Dungan Revolt (1862–77)
 Qing reconquest of Xinjiang

References

Notes

Sources
  (Full text is available on Internet Archive; a recent reprint is available as e.g. )
 
 Yakub Beg in Encyclopædia Britannica
 Yakub Beg Invasion (At Kashgar City official website – quite detailed, although, admittedly, not in very grammatical English)

In literature
 Yakub Beg is a secondary character in the novel Flashman at the Charge, published in 1973.
 Demetrius Charles Boulger, The life of Yakoob Beg; Athalik Ghazi, and Badaulet; Ameer of Kashgar , London: Wm.H. Allen & Co., 1878 (From the Open Library)
 A fictionalization of Yakub Beg's life appears in the novel Tales of Inner Asia by Todd Gibson

External links
 
 Copper coins of the Rebels- Rashiddin and Yakub Beg
 Verin Noravank Gospels, dating from 1487, includes a rare mention of Yakub Beg

1820 births
1877 deaths
Founding monarchs
History of Xinjiang
Khanate of Kokand
People from Tashkent Region